Girl with a Racquet or Girl Playing with a Racquet is an oil-on-canvas painting of a young girl holding a racquet and shuttlecock by the French artist Jean Siméon Chardin. He exhibited it at the Paris Salon in 1737 as a pendant to The House of Cards (Washington) – he also exhibited Woman Playing in a Fountain and The Laundress (Stockholm) in the same Salon. It is now in the Uffizi in Florence, whose collections it entered in 1951.

References

1737 paintings
Paintings by Jean-Baptiste-Siméon Chardin
Paintings in the collection of the Uffizi
Paintings of children